Willi Blodt (4 November 1929 – 3 December 2022) was a German politician. A member of the Social Democratic Party, he served in the Landtag of Hesse from 1966 to 1970. Mayor of Wolfskehlen 1960-1970, later Landrat of District Groß-Gerau.

Blodt died on 3 December 2022, at the age of 93.

References

1929 births
2022 deaths
Members of the Landtag of Hesse
People from Groß-Gerau (district)
Social Democratic Party of Germany politicians
Commanders Crosses of the Order of Merit of the Federal Republic of Germany